Methylfentanyl may refer to:

 3-Methylfentanyl
 α-Methylfentanyl
 β-Methylfentanyl